Casi Ángeles (English: Almost Angels) is an Argentine teen telenovela by Cris Morena which was aired by Telefe. Its first broadcast was on 21 March 2007 and it ended on 29 November 2010, with a total of 579 episodes divided over four seasons. It is considered one of the most successful Telenovelas in Argentinian television history. A star-studded soap-opera, Casi Ángeles stars Nicolás Vázquez, Emilia Attias, Mariano Torre and Teen Angels (Juan Pedro Lanzani, Mariana Espósito, Gastón Dalmau, Nicolás Riera, María Eugenia Suárez). Also due to the success of the show, the pop band Teen Angels emerged, composed of Juan Pedro Lanzani, Mariana Espósito, Gastón Dalmau, Nicolás Riera, María Eugenia Suárez. The show can now be watched on YouTube.

It gave rise to the emergence of the pop band Teen Angels, made up of Mariana Espósito, Juan Pedro Lanzani, Nicolás Riera, Gastón Dalmau and María Eugenia Suárez.  In 2011, Rocío Igarzábal, who was a member of the main cast of the telenovela and had participated in several songs, replaced Suárez. In the series, Rocío was part of the group Man, which made up their competition. Along with her, that group consisted of Agustín Sierra, Candela Vetrano, Pablo Martinez and Maria Del Cerro. The group released five studio albums and two live albums, counting four theatrical seasons performed at the Gran Rex in Argentina, touring concerts along the interior of Argentina, some Latin American countries, as well as Israel.

Production  
The series was mainly filmed in Pampa Studios, located in Buenos Aires, although also some takes were shot in the street. During the end of 2008 the cast and production went on to film the first 5 episodes of the third season on location, to be more specific, in different points in the provinces of Mendoza and San Juan. Also, to record the last episodes of the same season, the team went to San Pedro, a town in Buenos Aires. Towards the end of the last season, the actors Peter Lanzani, Pablo Martínez and Rocío Igarzábal, recorded in the ruins of Villa Epecuén.

Plot 
Casi Ángeles is the story of a group of homeless and/ or orphaned children and teenagers who are exploited and forced to steal for Bartolomé Bedoya Agüero (Alejo García Pintos) and Justina Merarda García (Julia Calvo). However, everything changes when Cielo Mágico (Emilia Attias), acrobat and dancer, and Dr. Nicolás Bauer (Nicolás Vázquez), an archaeologist, enter the kids' lives. Cielo, through her music, her love and her kindness, and Nicolás, with his fatherly nature and dreams, give the children the chance to believe in joy again. They both keep important secrets that, when discovered, will change everyone's lives forever. This is a story packed with magic, love, music, songs, dances and competitions. Nonetheless, there is a mystery within the house and their relations, and it involves every single one of them. Their individual and group stories have to do with the secrets protected by the hidden portal in the clock inside the Inchaustis' mansion and the special connection that everyone has with it and each other. As a magic object, this portal has chosen each and every one of the Casi Ángeles with the utmost care, and everyone thus has a mission. Discovering this mission will be the meaning of this action-packed adventure.

Seasons

Season 1; The Eudamón Island (2007) 
The story begins when Ángeles Inchausti, aka Cielo Mágico (Emilia Attias), a circus acrobat, and Nicolás Bauer (Nicolás Vázquez), an archaeologist (obsessed with finding the Eudamón Island), arrive at the Inchausti Mansion. In this mansion, the evil Bartolomé Bedoya Agüero (Alejo García Pintos) serves as director of the BB Foundation, a foundation for orphans which he uses as a façade for his fearsome plans. In this house, the orphaned children are exploited by Bartolomé and his housekeeper, Justina Merarda García (Julia Calvo), by being enslaved to work and steal, while they are heavily punished if they don't do as told. Fortunately, his plans are threatened with the unknown appearance of the heiresses of the house, Ángeles and her little sister Luz Inchausti. Cielo and Nico will help and rescue these kids, discovering in the meantime the dark secrets that the Inchausti Mansion hides, linked to Cielo's past and the Island of Eudamón.

Season 2; The Man of the Thousand Faces (2008) 
In the second season, the kids, not being subdued by Bartolomé Bedoya Agüero any longer, start having a normal life, in the renamed : Magical Home, now directed by Nico (Nicolás Vázquez) and Cielo/Ángeles (Emilia Attias); who at first is missing after being absorbed by the magic portal (clock) inside the mansion. However, new kids come to the house/ foundation, and the Corporación Cruz [CC] appears, led by Juan Cruz (Mariano Torre), the main villain of this season and Thiago's biological father. JC is a fallen angel, a shadow, obsessed with returning to Eudamón, and with Cielo, who managed, just like him, to reach that "other level". Juan Cruz will try to emotionally break everyone who lives in the mansion, and in order to achieve his goal, will try in many ways to prevent Cielo from having her and Nico's daughter: Paz.

Season 3; The Little Prince (2009)
The third season incorporates themes such as lateral thinking and ecology, which were added to and reinforced ideas implemented in previous seasons such as freedom of expression and social awareness. This season, the kids and Justina reappear in different places, 22 years in the future, after opening the book of the 7 padlocks on the fountain in front of the Mansion. From there, with the help of their "acquired nieces": Paz (Emilia Attias) and Hope (Jimena Barón), Nico's daughters, and the help of Camilo Estrella (Mariano Torre); they will discover their mission, that turns out to be "Save Paz" (which also means : "Save the peace [in the world]") to return home. Paz is a restless, disobedient girl, with a maternal, liberal and protective spirit, who falls in love with Camilo Estrella, the new director of the Mandalay Institute. In this season, Juan Cruz, unable to prevent the birth of Paz, will try to kill her 22 years later, in order to return to Eudamón. To all this are also added the confrontation against the dictatorial government under the command of the Chief of Ministers (Mercedes Funes), and each of the characters personal problemas and developments.

Season 4; The Resistance (2010)
Casi Ángeles: "La Resistencia", is the consequence of having saved Paz (Emilia Attias). Having fulfilled that mission meant succumbing to a great temporal paradox, where the Head of Ministers (Mercedes Funes), who turned out to be Luz Inchausti, launched "The Little Prince" protocol. From there, the kids were unable to return to their time and they scattered. Several were captured by the Government Corporation, reset and taken to what was once the Mandalay, now transformed completely by Luz and called NE Institute (NE, is the acronym for New Era). The others the other guys are part of "The Resistance" and from there, they will do everything possible to fulfill their new mission and return home.

Cast

Season 1

Protagonists 
 Nicolás Vázquez as Nicolás Andrés Bauer 
 Emilia Attias as Ángeles Inchausti / Cielo Mágico

Main Cast 
 Juan Pedro Lanzani as Thiago Adolfo Bedoya Agüero
 Mariana Espósito as Marianella Talarico Rinaldi 
 María Eugenia Suárez as Jazmín Romero Guzmán 
 Gastón Dalmau as Ramiro Ordóñez 
 Nicolás Riera as Juan "Tacho" Morales
 Stéfano de Gregorio as León "Lleca" Benítez
 Agustín Sierra as Ignacio "Nachito" Pérez Alzamendi
 Candela Vetrano as Estefanía "Tefi" Elordi Rinaldi 
 Alejo García Pintos as Bartolomé Bedoya Agüero  
 Gimena Accardi as Malvina Bedoya Agüero
 Julia Calvo as Justina Merarda García
 Guadalupe Antón as Alelí Ordóñez
 Tomás Ross as Cristóbal Bauer / Cristóbal Ibarlucía
 Florencia Cagnasso as Luz Inchausti
 Nazareno Antón as Mateo "Monito" Bauer Inchausti
 Gerardo Chendo as Mogli
 Lucas Ferraro as Marcos Ibarlucía / James Jonses

Antagonists 
 Alejo García Pintos as Bartolomé Bedoya Agüero  
 Julia Calvo as Justina Merarda García

Participations 
 Sergio Bermejo as Adolfo Pérez Alzamendi 
 Luz Cipriota as Brenda Azúcar
 Luis Campos as Pedro Rinaldi
 Silvina Bosco as Rosalía Ordóñez
 Luis Gianneo as Ernesto Vico
 Ezequiel Castaño as Alberto "Albertito" Paulazzo
 Vilma Ferrán as Rosarito Guevara de Dios
 Dani La Chepi as María 
 Jenny Williams as Bárbara
 Benjamín Rojas as Himself
 Marcos Woinski as Aldo Esteban Inchausti
 Juan Carlos Galván as Jasper Hantus
 Graciela Pal as Berta Bauer
 Lucrecia Blanco as Carla Kosovsky
 Gustavo Bonfigli as Ramón Bueno
 Débora Warren as Sandra Rinaldi / Julia Elordi
 Fabián Talín as Sergio Elordi
 Celina Font as Ornella Blaquier
 Tony Lestingi as Ismael Azúcar
 Adrián Spinelli as Mauro Loyza
 Coni Marino as Mercedes Benítez
 Alejandro Gancé as Marcelo Benítez
 Graciela Stéfani as María Laura "Malala" Torres Oviedo Vda. de Santillán
 Ángela Ragno as Older Esperanza Bauer
 Laura Anders as Dolores
 Federico Amador as Álex
 Giselle Bonafino as Lola
 Dolores Ocampo as Federica
 Sofía Elliot as Marilyn
 Camila Riveros as Josefina "Ardilla" Lucero
 Gabo Correa as Malatesta
 Marcelo Mazzarello as "El Payaso Llorón"
 Solange Verina

Season 2

Protagonists 
 Nicolás Vázquez as Nicolás Andrés Bauer 
 Emilia Attias as Ángeles Inchausti / Cielo Mágico / Linda Barba

Main Cast 
 Juan Pedro Lanzani as Thiago Adolfo Bedoya Agüero
 Mariana Espósito as Marianella Talarico Rinaldi 
 María Eugenia Suárez as Jazmín Romero Guzmán 
 Gastón Dalmau as Ramiro Ordóñez 
 Nicolás Riera as Juan "Tacho" Morales
 Stéfano de Gregorio as León "Lleca" Benítez
 Agustín Sierra as Ignacio "Nachito" Pérez Alzamendi
 Candela Vetrano as Estefanía "Tefi" Elordi Rinaldi 
 Pablo Martínez as Simón Bruno Arrechavaleta Rodríguez 
 Rocío Igarzábal as Valeria Gutiérrez 
 María Del Cerro as Melody Paz
 Gimena Accardi as Malvina Bedoya Agüero
 Julia Calvo as Justina Merarda García / Felicitas García
 Victorio D´Alessandro as Luca Franccini
 Daniela Aita as Caridad Martina Cuesta
 Guadalupe Antón as Alelí Ordóñez
 Tomás Ross as Cristóbal Bauer / Cristóbal Ibarlucía
 Florencia Cagnasso as Luz Inchausti
 Nazareno Antón as Mateo "Monito" Bauer Inchausti

Antagonists 
 Julia Calvo as Justina Merarda García
 Mariano Torre as Juan Cruz York
 Manuela Pal as Franka Mayerhold
 David Masajnik as Charly

Participations 
 Alejo García Pintos as Bartolomé Bedoya Agüero  
 Nicolás Pauls as Salvador Quiroga Harms / Juan Cruz York
 Vilma Ferrán as Rosarito Guevara de Dios
 Marta González as Hilda Fernández 
 Claudia Lapacó as Dora Aguirre
 Calu Rivero as Juliette
 David Chocarro as Matt
 Victoria Maurette as Lic. Fahrenheit 
 Pato Menahem as Bruno "Tic-Tac" Bedoya Agüero Talarico Rinaldi     
 Sofía Palagreco as Baby Esperanza "Hope" Bauer
 Ángela Ragno as Older Esperanza Bauer
 Alan Soria as Jerónimo Vanstrante
 Lucrecia Blanco as Carla Kosovsky
 Graciela Pal as Berta Suliga
 Débora Warren as Sandra Rinaldi
 César Bordón as Mauro "Terremoto" Talarico
 Celina Font as Ornella Blaquier
 Bárbara Napal González as Lucía Pérez Alzamendi
 Aldo Pastur as Francisco Arrechavaleta
 Paloma Gordo as Soledad Arrechavaleta Rodríguez 
 Mariano Torre as Serafín
 Nicolás Garnier as Hernán
 Eliseo Barrionuevo as César
 Paola Sallustro as Luisa "Lulú"
 Vanesa Leiro as Cheta
 ¿? as Octavio Arrechavaleta Rodríguez 
 ¿? as Valentín Arrechavaleta Rodríguez

Season 3

Protagonists 
 Emilia Attias as Paz Bauer
 Mariano Torre as Camilo Estrella

Main Cast 
 Juan Pedro Lanzani as Thiago Adolfo Bedoya Agüero
 Mariana Espósito as Marianella Talarico Rinaldi 
 María Eugenia Suárez as Jazmín Romero Guzmán 
 Gastón Dalmau as Ramiro Ordóñez 
 Nicolás Riera as Juan "Tacho" Morales
 Stéfano de Gregorio as León "Lleca" Benítez
 Agustín Sierra as Ignacio "Nachito" Pérez Alzamendi / Brian Ignacio "Nerdito" Pérez Alzamendi Elordi
 Candela Vetrano as Estefanía "Tefi" Elordi Rinaldi 
 Pablo Martínez as Simón Bruno Arrechavaleta Rodríguez 
 Rocío Igarzábal as Valeria Gutiérrez 
 María Del Cerro as Melody Paz
 Paula Reca as Luna Vörg
 Jimena Barón as Esperanza "Hope" Bauer
 Daniela Aita as Caridad Martina Cuesta / Juan Cruz York
 Daniela Collini as Francisca "Kika" Zanata 
 Jaime Domínguez as Jaime Molina 
 Máximo Reca as Pedro Vörg
 Benjamín Amadeo as Teo Gorki
 Julia Calvo as Justina Merarda García
 Lucas Crespi as Víctor Vörg
 Maximiliano Ghione as Rafael Alsina

Antagonists 
 Mariano Torre as Juan Cruz York

Participations 
 Emilia Attias as Ángeles Inchausti / Cielo Mágico
 Ricardo Montaner as Bruno "Tic-Tac" Bedoya Agüero Talarico Rinaldi 
 Romina Yan as Ariel
 Benjamín Rojas as Cacho de Buenos Aires
 Axel as Bruno "Tic-Tac" Bedoya Agüero Talarico Rinaldi 
 Mercedes Funes as Luz Inchausti
 Pato Menahem as Bruno "Tic-Tac" Bedoya Agüero Talarico Rinaldi 
 Ángela Ragno as Older Esperanza Bauer
 Sebastián Cura as Sebastián "Torito" Cura
 Leandro Coccaro as Evaristo Gorki
 Agustina Córdova as Sol Aguirre
 Eugenia Luz Mariani as Martina Pérez Alzamendi Cuesta
 Axel Kuschevatzky as Himself / Bruno "Tic-Tac" Bedoya Agüero Talarico Rinaldi 
 Grego Rossello as Jerry
 Gastón Vietto como Máximo "Max"
 Rafael Ferro as Ariel's boyfriend

Season 4

Protagonists 
 Juan Pedro Lanzani as Thiago Adolfo Bedoya Agüero
 Mariana Espósito as Marianella Talarico Rinaldi 
 María Eugenia Suárez as Jazmín Romero Guzmán 
 Gastón Dalmau as Ramiro Ordóñez 
 Nicolás Riera as Juan "Tacho" Morales
 Stéfano de Gregorio as León "Lleca" Benítez
 Agustín Sierra as Ignacio "Nachito" Pérez Alzamendi / Brian Ignacio "Nerdito" Pérez Alzamendi Elordi
 Candela Vetrano as Estefanía "Tefi" Elordi Rinaldi 
 Pablo Martínez as Simón Bruno Arrechavaleta Rodríguez 
 Rocío Igarzábal as Valeria Gutiérrez 
 María Del Cerro as Melody Paz
 Jimena Barón as Esperanza "Hope" Bauer
 Victorio D´Alessandro as Luca Franccini
 Daniela Collini as Francisca "Kika" Zanata

Main Cast 
 Valentina Zenere as Alai Morales Romero / Alai Inchausti  
 Lucrecia Oviedo as René Teng
 Belén Chavanne as Rose Arrechavaleta Gutiérrez / Gianina "Nina" Inchausti  
 Mercedes Funes as Luz Inchausti
 Benjamín Amadeo as Teo Gorki
 Julián Rubino as Jhonny

Antagonists 
 Pablo Martínez as Mr. Jay

Participations 
 Nicolás Vázquez as Nicolás Andrés Bauer 
 Emilia Attias as Ángeles Inchausti / Cielo Mágico / Paz Bauer
 Gimena Accardi as Malvina Bedoya Agüero
 Augusto Schuster as Pablo "Isla Negri" Picasso
 Marisol Romero as Tamara López Ovalles
 Silvina Bosco as  Rosalía Ordóñez
 Alejo García Pintos as Bartolomé Bedoya Agüero  
 Sergio Bermejo as Adolfo Pérez Alzamendi
 Natalia Melcon as Analey
 Julia Calvo as Justina Merarda García / Felicitas García
 Donatella Massa as Young Esperanza "Hope" Bauer
 Pato Menahem as Bruno "Tic-Tac" Bedoya Agüero Talarico Rinaldi 
 Ángela Ragno as Older Esperanza Bauer
 Daniela Aita as Caridad Martina Cuesta
 Guadalupe Antón as Alelí Ordóñez
 Tomás Ross as Cristóbal Bauer / Cristóbal Ibarlucía
 Florencia Cagnasso as Luz Inchausti
 Nazareno Antón as Mateo "Monito" Bauer Inchausti
 Jorge Suárez as Older Thiago Adolfo Bedoya Agüero
 Tobías Bernárdez as Bruno Bedoya Agüero Talarico Rinaldi 
 Jaime Domínguez as Jaime Molina 
 Sebastián Cura as Sebastián "Torito" Cura
 Valentina Ruiz as Paloma Hernández 
 Manuela Pal as Franka Mayerhold
 Agustina Prinsich as Valentina Vegga / Agustina Donofrio
 Perla Brostein as Perla "Tierra Prometida" Schneider 
 Cristián Belgrano as Gonzalo
 Marina Quesada as Ingrid
 María Zamarbide as Uma
 Lautaro Rodríguez as Hegel
 Belén Persello as Terra
 Luciano Nobile as Joel 
 ¿? as Young Paz Bauer
 ¿? as Amado Gorki Paz
 ¿? as Octavio Arrechavaleta Rodríguez 
 ¿? as Baby Alai Morales Romero

Emission and reception 
At first, «Casi Ángeles» was directed towards a specific audience, particularly to children and adolescents and, in some cases, young adults. In its first season, it averaged 12.0 points along the 166 issues.

In the second season, the program was much more oriented to the adolescent public, increasing the cast of that strip, in addition to the love conflicts between Cielo and Nico. A new format was introduced for a daily fiction: the episodes had titles and ended with a monologue in "off", following the model of the North American series and moments of suspense became important. This season achieved an average of 13.6 rating points in its 160 issues.

In January, Disney Channel began broadcasting the program for Latin America, in an edited version that eliminated all scenes of sex and violence.

The third season, which aired in Argentina in April 2009 and ended on 3 December, with an average of 13.9 rating points, in its 140 issues, was the most viewed season.

The fourth season started in April 2010 and was aired until 29 November of the same year. During the month of June it was out of the air due to the transmission by the channel of the World Cup South Africa 2010. Therefore, it was the shortest season with 113 episodes, achieving a high average of 11.6 points.

Eleven years have gone by after its release (2020) and the audience has enlarged. Not only are yesterday's teenagers, now all grown-ups and young adults rewatching Casi Ángeles but today's adolescents are also submerging themselves into following the adventures of Nico, Cielo and the kids, (and later only the kids) through the most unexpected and life-changing adventures. Nowadays the series can be watched on YouTube on the verified channel of the same name, Casi Angeles. The four complete seasons have been uploaded plus the extra material that was broadcast on TV back in the day. What is more, the channel is constantly updated with videos about the making of the show, some fun-facts and some videos to celebrate special days. In addition, the Instagram account @bycrismorena, which belongs to the producer of the show, regularly posts pictures, videos and edits.

International Broadcast 
The series in addition to being broadcast by Telefe is also broadcast by air and cable channels in different countries of the world, reason why the strip transcended the borders and got a big fanatic around the world, being highlighted Israel. Some of the featured channels are: Jetix South American Zone, as it issued the first two of the strip and Disney Channel north zone, which is in charge of its respective zone of emission.

Team Angels/Bonus Track 
The Team Angels or Bonus Track is a block of the program that began to be broadcast 20 June 2008 during the second season of the series in Argentina and that was emitted at the end of each episode. It lasted for about five minutes. In this segment, you could see interviews with the actors and creators, bloopers, behind the scenes, backstage of the Gran Rex Theater performances, rehearsals, real-cam of the actors, questionnaires, fans' videos, among others.

Logo creation 
In Season 1, the logo had two angel wings united by a safety pin, which also represented the A for Ángeles. The wings were covered in patches to represent the fact they were poor and had affection holes in their hearts. This explanation was given by Cris Morena during an interview for Produ.tv.

In Season 2, the patches disappeared from the logo. In this season, the characters were not poor anymore and had a loving family.

In Season 3, there was not a safety pin uniting the two wings anymore. The font of Casi Ángeles changed slightly. The logo background image had a mandala, which is one important symbol this season, for example, the school they attend is called Mandalay. For a brief period of the Season 3, the logo went dark to represent the fact Camilo Estrella, Mariano Torre character, had been possessed by the evil Juan Cruz and tragedy would ensue.

In the third-season finale, the fourth season logo was revealed. It is orange and black and it has a different font. There's also a peace sign with two wings coming out of it. The I and V from the title resemble the Roman number for 4, IV.

Reception 
Although the show had a good critical reception, Casi Ángeles was received with lukewarm ratings. The fans of Cris Morena criticized the show for being too repetitive, with scenes exactly like some of her previous hits such as Rebelde Way, Floricienta, Chiquititas and Alma Pirata. In the beginning, the show did not have a specific audience, it was targeted to kids and teenagers with some story lines skewing too young while others too old. The ratings were dropping and the highly promoted Patito Feo debuted on Canal 13 at the same time slot, and easily beat Casi Ángeles ratings. While repercussion and sales of Patito Feo products were astronomic and ratings were soaring, Casi Ángeles rating numbers were struggling which prompted Telefe to hurriedly change the show to an earlier time slot.

Also some changes were made in Casi Ángeles. The show concentrated on teenagers and started distancing from previous shows of Cris Morena, adding mystery and suspense elements. The changes had an effect and the audience started to grow. After a few weeks in the earlier time slot, the show returned to its original 6 P.M. slot, again confronting Patito Feo and this time it had similar rating numbers. In the end, the show had an average of 12 points according to Ibope, only 0.2 points lower than Patito Feo. The Season 1 finale reached 15 points, a series high and 1 point higher than Patito Feos finale.

Although the show was struggling on television, the 2007 musical with the entire cast of the show in Teatro Gran Rex was the highest-grossing live event of the year. As usual, Cris Morena invested millions of dollars in a high-tech concert full of expensive effects and production. It sold over 120,000 tickets. The first-season soundtrack album, with all songs sung by the cast, ranked 12th on the best-selling albums of 2007 list compiled by CAPIF, much lower than Patito Feo'''s soundtrack which was number one. It also ranked lower than some of the previous Cris Morena production soundtracks (Chiquititas 2006 was sixth on the annual list in 2006, Floricienta 2 was first in 2005, Floricienta 1 was 3rd in 2004 and 10th in 2005, Erreway's Señales was 3rd in 2002 and 7th in 2003) although it did achieve Platinum certification. During the summer hiatus, the cast of the show played concerts in Córdoba, Rosario and Punta del Este.

In the second season, the show got a total makeover. It became much more oriented to teenagers, with the Teen Angels receiving more screen time and Nico and Cielo's relationship less. It also introduced a new format for a daily fiction: episodes had titles and ended in monologues, following the model of U.S. shows such as Grey's Anatomy, Sex and the City and Desperate Housewives. In the same vein as Lost, the mystery elements became very important. The changes were well received and the show's rating exploded. It easily beat Patito Feos Season 2 number; while the Canal 13 show had a 9 points average, 3 points lower than previous season, Casi Ángeles Season 2 averaged 14 points, 2 points higher. The second soundtrack album was also a strong seller, achieving double platinum and ending the year as the third-best-selling album in the annual ranking.

The Teen Angels popularity skyrocketed with the cast appearing on the cover of several magazines and attracting huge hysteria wherever they went. In Unicenter, a store was opened to sell exclusive Casi Ángeles merchandising, Fans Store. The 2008 live musical in Teatro Gran Rex broke records with 220,000 tickets sold, the second highest attendance ever in the theater's 81 years of history and doubling the number of the previous season After the season of concerts in Buenos Aires, the Teen Angels toured extensively in Argentina, selling out arenas everywhere. They also played a sold-out concert for 40,000 in Montevideo, Uruguay. After the second-season finale, the cast played six additional concerts in Buenos Aires, and, during the summer hiatus, the Teen Angels were chosen as the spokespersons for Coca-Cola. They recorded the song "Hoy Quiero" which became the official Coke Summer Anthem. Also during the summer, they played two sold-out concerts in Mar del Plata and opened the official Coca-Cola stand in Pinamar, attracting over 2500 people to the event.

In January, Disney Channel started airing the show to Latin America, in a highly edited version cutting all the sexual and violent elements. To promote the show and their CD, the Teen Angels traveled to Mexico City for a showcase and interviews. The third season finally debuted in Argentina in April, six months after production began. Without no substantial competition, after Patito Feo was canceled due to season 2's disastrous number, ratings went through the roof. The third season average is, up to August, 15 points, two points higher than 2008. The third CD is also the best-selling album of the year until the moment. However, the live musical could not top the first two seasons' attendance numbers due to the swine flu epidemic which caused panic in Buenos Aires in July, during the Winter vacations. In August, sales were normalized and the concerts started to sell out fast as usual. However, all the canceled shows in July meant 2009 musical would not top previous years' numbers. In the end, it sold 100,000 tickets, which was less than the two previous seasons.

In late 2008, after the debut of the second season, Casi Ángeles became a gigantic hit in Israel. Peter Lanzani and Lali Espósito visited the country to promote the show and caused hysteria. The complete cast visited Tel Aviv in October 2009 for a series of sold-out concerts which had over 80,000 tickets sold. Peter and Mariana were also chosen as spokespeople for the Keff shampoo.

The third season ended on 5 December 2009. It reached 16.6 points and didn't exceed the season 2 season finale or the season 3 debut (both achieved 18.4 points). Season 3 averaged 14 points, the same as season 2. However, there was a drop in the ratings from the middle of the season.

In November, the Teen Angels did a promotional tour across Latin America. In December, they'll visit Spain and Italy.

The show was renewed for a fourth season and will return to Telefe in 2010. The Teen Angels will star in Coca-Cola Argentina's Christmas promotional campaign and will be featured on Coke's cans.

 Licensing Casi Ángeles spawned a series of merchandising. During the Season 1, the products were targeted to children with toys, apparel, bicycle, cosmetics among others targeting mostly young girls. With the second season became teenage-oriented and the licensing program also started to skew older beginning. Stationery items, posters, postcards, furniture, clothing line, perfumes among other products were released to accompany the second and the third season. An official store, Fans Store, is located at Unicenter shopping mall in Buenos Aires.

The show also spawned an official monthly magazine, four sticker albums by Panini, three soundtrack albums, two live album, among other products. The program has tie-ins with several brands. Lingerie line Sweet Victorian and label 47 Street are sponsors of the show and also responsible for the wardrobe of most female characters. Shoe brand Jaguar is also a sponsor and their products are advertised on the show and used by the characters. Jaguar also has a Casi Angeles shoe line available. Coca-Cola and Movistar also have ties with the program.

 Other releases 

 Team Angels Team Angels is a five-minute segment usually aired at the end of each episode with backstage, interviews, among other extra content. This segment was introduced in the Season 2. Luli Fernández and Jaime Domínguez hosted the show in 2008; in 2009 they were replaced with Carolina Ibarra and Gastón Vietto. The format changed for the fourth season, changing the segment to Bonus Track where most of the content is put online through YouTube Casi Ángeles channel.
In the fourth season they took out the name Team Angels and named it Bonus Track.
The aired content includes backstage videos from the concerts and the shooting of Casi Ángeles; Teen Angels music videos; Real Cam, when a member of the cast use a handheld camero to document his day and life; interviews; Q&A, when the actors reply the question posted by Casi Ángeles fans via its official website, etc. In 2009 Team Angels added the Fans Store, so fans can leave their messages for the cast; some of these messages are aired during the show. In some occasions, Team Angels have special exhibitions, named Casual Team.

 Soundtracks albums 

 DVDs 

 Books La isla de Eudamon is the first book to be published.

On 1 July 2010, the second book Resiste - clave para encontrar tu llave was published. This book is best selling in Argentina. The book reveals secrets that were not in the TV series.Resiste was produced by Cris Morena Group and RGB Entertainment with inclusion Editorial Planeta.

In December 2011, a book called El hombre de las mil caras was published for the second season.

 Episodes  

 International broadcasting 

 Awards and nominations 

 References 

 External links 
 Official Website
 Casi Ángeles'' at the Internet Movie Database

2007 telenovelas
2007 Argentine television series debuts
2010 Argentine television series endings
Argentine telenovelas
Spanish-language telenovelas
Telefe telenovelas